These are tables of congressional delegations from Maryland in the United States House of Representatives and the United States Senate.

The current dean of the Maryland delegation is Representative and former House Majority Leader Steny Hoyer (MD-5), having served in the House since 1981.

U.S. House of Representatives

Current members
List of members, their terms in office, district boundaries, and the district political ratings according to the CPVI. The delegation has 8 members: 7 Democrats and 1 Republican.

1789–1793: Six seats

1793–1803: Eight seats 

Maryland gained two representatives, up to eight.

1803–1833: Nine seats 
Maryland gained one representative, up to nine. The fifth district had two representatives: one from Baltimore City, and the other from Baltimore County, Maryland.

1833–1843: Eight seats 

Maryland lost one representative, down to eight. The fourth district had two representatives from 1835 to 1843.

1843–1863: Six seats 
Maryland lost two representatives, down to six.

1863–1873: Five seats 
Maryland lost one representative, down to five.

1873–1953: Six seats 
Maryland gained one representative, up to six for the next 80 years.

1953–1963: Seven seats 
Maryland gained one representative, up to seven.

1963–present: Eight seats 
Maryland gained one representative, up to eight. From 1963 through 1967, the eighth seat was elected at-large statewide. Starting in 1967, however, the state was redistricted and an eighth district was created.

United States Senate 

}}
The alternating grey and white boxes indicate the duration of six-year Senate terms.

Key

See also

List of United States congressional districts
Maryland's congressional districts
Political party strength in Maryland

Notes

References 

 
 
Maryland
Politics of Maryland
Congressional delegations